Cyathopoma nishinoi is a species of land snail with an operculum, a terrestrial gastropod mollusk in the family Cyclophoridae. This species is endemic to Japan.

References

Molluscs of Japan
Cyclophoridae
Gastropods described in 1980
Taxonomy articles created by Polbot